Kristin Elizabeth "Krissy" Wendell-Pohl (born September 12, 1981) is an American former women's ice hockey player, and current amateur scout for The Pittsburgh Penguins. During the 2004–05 season, Wendell set an NCAA record for most short-handed goals in one season, with seven. At the conclusion of her college career, she held the record for most career short-handed goals, with 16. Both marks have since been equaled by Meghan Agosta. Wendell is currently in the Top 10 for all-time NCAA scoring, with 237 career points.

Playing career
While attending Park Center Senior High School in Brooklyn Park, Minnesota, Wendell led the girls' hockey team to a state championship. At the time she graduated from high school, Wendell was the state of Minnesota's all-time leading girls' high school scorer.

Wendell was a co-captain of the Minnesota Golden Gophers women's ice hockey team. A forward, she scored 133 points in two seasons (2002–2003, 2003–2004) for the Gophers. Wendell scored the game-winning goal in the 2005 Western Collegiate Hockey Association (WCHA) championship game against Wisconsin. Wendel followed that with a hat-trick against ECAC champion Harvard. Wendell was the NCAA runner-up in the scoring race to her teammate Natalie Darwitz with 98 points. Wendell did lead the NCAA in short-handed goals, with seven. She won the Patty Kazmaier Award in 2005 for best female collegiate hockey player. Wendell was the first player from Minnesota, and the first from the WCHA, to win the award.

Wendell was one of the stars of the United States women's national ice hockey team, and served as their team captain. She made her debut with the team at the 1998 Three Nations Cup.
At the 2005 IIHF Women's World Championship, Wendell was named MVP, and led all players in scoring with nine points, as the United States won its first gold medal at the women's world championships. She was a member of the United States team at the 2006 Winter Olympics, winning a bronze medal.

Post-playing career 
Following her playing career, Wendell-Pohl coached girls high school hockey in Minnesota with her husband, and former NHL player, Johnny Pohl. She was then hired by the Pittsburgh Penguins as a scout on November 6, 2021, becoming the third woman to hold a scouting position with an NHL team after Cammi Granato and Blake Bolden. Her responsibilities are to scout amateur players, predominantly high school players, in the Minnesota area.

Personal life 
In , Wendell was the fifth girl to play in the Little League World Series, and the first to start at the catcher position.

Wendell was featured on the Nickelodeon game show, Figure It Out, when she was 16.

She married NHL player John Pohl on August 11, 2007, in Roseville, Minnesota. They have three daughters.

Awards 
 2000 Minnesota Ms. Hockey Award
 2000 Bob Johnson Award for excellence in international competition (awarded at the USA Hockey Annual Congress)
 2001 USA Hockey player of the year
 2002 Olympic Silver Medal
 2003, 2004 NCAA D1 W. Ice Hockey Champion
 2004 Little League Hall of Excellence
 2004 NCAA Division I women's ice hockey tournament Most Outstanding Player
 2004 NCAA All-Tournament Team
 2005 NCAA All-Tournament Team
 2005 Patty Kazmaier Award
 2005 USA Hockey Bob Johnson Award
 2005 Most Valuable Player, Women's World Hockey Championships
 2006 Olympic Bronze Medal
 2007 All-Star, Women's World Hockey Championships
 2019 U.S. Hockey Hall of Fame

References

Further reading

External links
 
 Krissy Wendell at the U.S. Olympic Team website via Wayback Machine
 
 

1981 births
American women's ice hockey forwards
Ice hockey players from Minnesota
Ice hockey players at the 2002 Winter Olympics
Ice hockey players at the 2006 Winter Olympics
Living people
Medalists at the 2002 Winter Olympics
Medalists at the 2006 Winter Olympics
Minnesota Golden Gophers women's ice hockey players
Minnesota Ms. Hockey Award winners
Olympic bronze medalists for the United States in ice hockey
Olympic silver medalists for the United States in ice hockey
Patty Kazmaier Award winners
People from Brooklyn Park, Minnesota